"Swingin'" is a song co-written and recorded by American country music singer John Anderson.  It was released in January 1983 as the second single from his album Wild & Blue.  The song was the second of five number one singles in Anderson's career, spending one week at the top of the Hot Country Songs charts. It also received a gold certification from the Recording Industry Association of America, and received a Single of the Year award from the Country Music Association. Anderson re-recorded the song for his 1994 album Country 'til I Die on BNA Records. This re-recording served as the b-side to the album's title track, which was also the first single from it. In addition to LeAnn Rimes, Chris Young performed an acoustic cover of "Swingin'" for his 2010 EP Voices.

Chart performance

"Swingin'" debuted at number 71 on the U.S. Billboard Hot Country Singles for the week of January 15, 1983.

Weekly charts

Year-end charts

LeAnn Rimes version 

LeAnn Rimes covered the song on June 8, 2010 as the first single from her album Lady & Gentlemen. Rimes debuted her version of the song on the 2010 CMT Music Awards on June 9, 2010. The song debuted at number 60 on the Hot Country Songs chart for July 17, 2010. It spent four weeks on the chart and peaked at 57. The track is also nominated for a 2011 Grammy Award. Rimes's version of the song also featured a music video, directed by David McClister.

Track listing
Digital download
 "Swingin'" — 2:55

Chart performance

Other versions
Billie Jo Spears covered the song in 1983.
The Kidsongs kids covered the song on their 1994 video "Country Sing-Along".
Cledus T. Judd released a rap version of "Swingin" on his 1995 debut album Cledus T. Judd (No Relation). He starts off with the opening bars of John Anderson's 1983 hit, followed by Cledus saying "Let's dance!", which leads into a rap version of the song.
 "On the Swing" is a parody of "Swingin." It's on Lollipoprock 2, released in 2003.
The Mavericks covered the song for release as a digital download single in 2019.

References

External links
 
 .

1983 songs
2010 singles
John Anderson (musician) songs
LeAnn Rimes songs
Songs written by John Anderson (musician)
Warner Records singles
Curb Records singles
1983 singles
Songs written by Lionel Delmore